Catalonia national racquetball team represents the Catalan Racquetball Federation in racquetball international competitions. Competes as a member of the European Racquetball Federation and International Racquetball Federation. Catalonia won the European Championships in 2009, in the overall, men and women competitions.

History

Players

National team at the European Championship 2013

National team in the European Championship 2009 and World Championship 2008

References

External links
FCR Federació Catalana de Raquetbol

National racquetball teams
Racquetball